Boku may refer to:

 Bōku, a board game
 Boku (juice), a juice carton drink
 Boku, Inc., a San Francisco, California-based mobile payments company
 University of Natural Resources and Life Sciences, Vienna (Universität für Bodenkultur Wien; BOKU)
 Shō Boku (1739–1794), king of Ryukyu
 Boku, the former codename of Kodu, a child-oriented programming environment from Microsoft
 A first-person Japanese pronoun, with an implication of boyishness

See also